Patricia A. Roybal Caballero (born 1949/1950) is an American politician serving as a member of the New Mexico House of Representatives from the 13th district. Elected in 2012, she assumed office on January 15, 2013.

Education 
Roybal Caballero earned a Bachelor of Arts degree from the University of Colorado Boulder and a dual Master of Public Administration–Master of Community and Regional Planning from the University of New Mexico.

Career
Roybal Caballero is a member of Piro-Manso-Tiwa tribal faction and belongs to the Guadalupe Pueblo in New Mexico. She is one of two Native American women elected to the state legislature in 2012.

Personal life
Roybal Caballero is married to R. Carlos Caballero, the New Mexico public education commissioner for the 1st district. She has two sons.

Elections 
2012 
When District 13 incumbent Democratic Representative Eleanor Chavez ran for the New Mexico Senate and left the seat open, Roybal Caballero was unopposed for the June 5, 2012 Democratic Primary, winning with 834 votes, She won the November 6, 2012 general election with 4,452 votes (71.5%) against Republican nominee Jose Orozco.
2021

After the resignation of Deb Haaland, who resigned after being nominated by Joe Biden to become the United States Secretary of the Interior, Roybal Caballero announced her candidacy for congress from New Mexico's 1st congressional district. At the Democratic committee selection, she came in last place earning only one vote; fellow representative Melanie Stansbury would go on to win the nomination.

References

External links
 Government website
 Campaign website

 Patricia A. Roybal Caballero at Ballotpedia

21st-century American politicians
21st-century American women politicians
Candidates in the 2021 United States elections
Hispanic and Latino American state legislators in New Mexico
Hispanic and Latino American women in politics
Living people
Democratic Party members of the New Mexico House of Representatives
Native American state legislators in New Mexico
Native American women in politics
Place of birth missing (living people)
Politicians from Albuquerque, New Mexico
University of New Mexico alumni
Women state legislators in New Mexico
Year of birth missing (living people)
University of Colorado Boulder alumni
21st-century Native American women
21st-century Native Americans